Cold Day may refer to:

Cold Days, novel
Cold Day (album), album by Sonya Kitchell 
"Cold Day", The Day They Shot a Hole in the Jesus Egg
"Cold Day", Black Prairie Fortune 2014